Leon Johnson may refer to:

 Léon Johnson (1876–1943), French sport shooter
 Leon W. Johnson (1904–1997), U.S. Air Force general and Medal of Honor recipient
 Chaino (Leon Johnson, 1927–1999), American bongo player in the exotica genre
 Leon Johnson (running back) (born 1974), American football running back
 Leon Johnson (end) (1904–1978), American football end
 Leon Johnson (footballer) (born 1981), English football defender
 Leon Johnson (cricketer) (born 1987), West Indian cricketer from Guyana
 Leon H. Johnson (1908–1969), American chemist and mathematician